Roshwald is a surname. Notable people with the surname include:

Aviel Roshwald, American historian and academic
Mordecai Roshwald (1921–2015), American-Israeli academic and writer